Joredighi also known as Jordighi, is a small town located in Bansihari subdivision of Dakshin Dinajpur district in West Bengal, India. The postal code of Joredighi is 733121.

Population 

The estimated population of Joredighi is 500-1000.

Location 
It is situated 6.6km away from sub-district headquarter Buniadpur. Balurghat is the district headquarter of this town.

Banking facilities 

 Bangiya Gramin Vikash Bank, Joredighi Branch.

See also 
 Buniadpur, city in Dakshin Dinajpur
 Dahuakuri, village in Dakshin Dinajpur

References 

Cities and towns in Dakshin Dinajpur district